Two ships of the Royal Navy have borne the name HMS Valeur:

She was converted to a fire ship in 1716 and was broken up in 1718.

Royal Navy ship names